The discography of James Blunt, a British pop rock singer, contains six studio albums, two live albums, one compilation album, eleven extended plays and twenty eight singles.

Blunt's debut album, Back to Bedlam, was released by Atlantic Records in the United Kingdom in October 2004 and peaked at number one on the UK Albums Chart in July 2005 and within the top five across most of Europe. It also peaked at number one on the Canadian Albums Chart and number two on the Billboard 200 in the United States. The album has sold over 11 million copies worldwide and has been certified 11× Platinum in the UK. Back to Bedlam produced the singles "High", "Wisemen" and "Goodbye My Lover". The most successful single released from the album, "You're Beautiful", went to number one on the UK Singles Chart, Irish Singles Chart, Dutch Top 40 and the Billboard Hot 100 in the United States. It also peaked at number two in Australia and Germany.

Chasing Time: The Bedlam Sessions, a live album and DVD package, was released in February 2006. Blunt's second studio album, All the Lost Souls, was released in September 2007 and contained the singles "1973", "Same Mistake", "Carry You Home", "I Really Want You" and "Love, Love, Love". The album was less successful than Back to Bedlam, but still managed to top the charts around the world. Blunt's third album, Some Kind of Trouble was released in November 2010 and debuted at number four in the UK. Blunt's fourth studio album Moon Landing, was released in October 2013. It debuted and peaked at number two in the UK. He has sold more than 20 million records worldwide.

Albums

Studio albums

Live albums

Compilation albums

Box sets

Extended plays

Physical EPs

Digital EPs

Singles

As lead artist

As featured artist

Other charted songs

Music videos

Other appearances
These songs have appeared on a studio album not released by Blunt.

References

External links
 Official website
 

Pop music discographies
Discographies of British artists
Discography